Éibhear is an Irish language male given name of uncertain origin.  The word eibhear in Irish means granite and the name translates to "Harry" in English. Éibhear Fionn the son of Míl, was one of the mythological founders of the Irish people, the Milesians. The Irish Éibhear is anglicised as Heber or Eber.

See also
List of Irish-language given names
Harry (given name)

References

Irish-language masculine given names